Sinnington railway station was a minor station serving the village of Sinnington in North Yorkshire, England on the former Gilling and Pickering (G&P) line. Today's main A170 road follows the old railway line between Helmsley and Pickering.

The station had a small goods yard with three sidings, one serving coal drops, another a loading dock, and the third a cattle dock.

History 

Sinnington opened on 1 April 1875 as the last station on the line. After World War I and the emergence of more convenient motor bus services the passenger numbers dropped rapidly, with only about 35 tickets sold per week in the 1930s.

It closed on 31 January 1953 for both passengers and freight, with the end of the York-Pickering service via Gilling and Helmsley, and the track was lifted between Pickering and Kirkbymoorside in the same year. By this time there were only 3 trains each way per day.

The station building has been converted into a private residence, the coal drops into garages. The platform and the weigh office are still in place.

Public transport to Sinnington today 

Sinnington is served by East Yorkshire bus no. 128 running between Kirkbymoorside and Pickering, Scarborough and Helmsley  running up to hourly during the day, but with no Sunday winter service.

References

External links
 Sinnington station on navigable O. S. map

Disused railway stations in North Yorkshire
Railway stations in Great Britain opened in 1875
Railway stations in Great Britain closed in 1953
Former North Eastern Railway (UK) stations